Rubus roseus (mora silvestre) is a species of bramble, a flowering plant in the rose family, native to the high elevations of the Andes regions of South America.

Description
R. roseus is a low arching clusters of shrubs that grows up to 2 meters (6 feet 7 inches). The fruits are edible and commonly used in drinks and dyes. Edible parts of the Rubus Roseus are the fruit and are sometimes exported to Britain.

References

External links
 

roseus